Orca Peak is a peak, 395 m, standing west of Grytviken on the north coast of South Georgia. The name appears to be first used on a 1930 British Admiralty chart.

Mountains and hills of South Georgia